Daniel Belli (born 1 December 1963) is a Canadian sports shooter. He competed in the mixed skeet event at the 1984 Summer Olympics.

References

1963 births
Living people
Canadian male sport shooters
Olympic shooters of Canada
Shooters at the 1984 Summer Olympics
Sportspeople from Toronto